Clinical Biochemistry is a peer-reviewed scientific journal covering the analytical and clinical investigation of laboratory tests in humans used for diagnosis, molecular biology and genetics, prognosis, treatment and therapy, and monitoring of disease ; the discipline of clinical biochemistry. It is the official journal of the Canadian Society of Clinical Chemists.

Abstracting and indexing 
The journal is abstracted and indexed in BIOSIS, Chemical Abstracts, Current Contents/Life Sciences, EMBASE, MEDLINE, and Scopus.

Article categories 
The journal publishes the following types of articles:

Most cited articles 
According to SCOPUS, the following three articles have been cited most often (>70 times):

Baby Wash Products found to contain cannabinoid immunoassay 
Researchers at the University of North Carolina published an article in Clinical Biochemistry  which found Baby wash products could cause false drug test results. Newborn drug screening has a significant implications in both the healthcare and legal domains, on occasion resulting in involvement by social services or false child abuse allegations. The accuracy of the screening results is therefore essential. This research highlights reasons why false positive cannabinoid (THC) screening results may have occurred. Researchers identified commonly used soap and wash products used for newborn and infant care as potential causes of false positive THC screening results.

External links 
 
 Canadian Society of Clinical Chemists

Notes

Elsevier academic journals
Biochemistry journals
Laboratory medicine journals
Medicinal chemistry journals
English-language journals
Publications established in 1967